Soul Run is the debut full-length album from Canadian R&B artist Tanika Charles, first released independently in Canada on May 10, 2016, and internationally on April 7, 2017 through Record Kicks. It was long-listed for the 2016 Polaris Music Prize and nominated for the 2017 Juno Awards R&B/Soul Recording of the Year alongside The Weeknd, Daniel Caesar, dvsn and PARTYNEXTDOOR. Shortly after self-releasing the album in Canada, Tanika Charles signed with Italian funk/soul label Record Kicks. The international release that followed in 2017 included the additional song “Sweet Memories”.

The album was supported by the singles “Soul Run”, “Two Steps”, “Endless Chain” and "Love Fool”. Videos for “Soul Run” and “Endless Chain” were co-directed by Taha Muharuma and Shanik Tanna. A behind-the-scenes tour video for “Two Steps” was edited by Michael Warren and filmed by Jon Foster during Tanika Charles & The Wonderful's first European tour in December 2017.

Copies of the album are available on CD and LP, as well as across all streaming and digital download music services. The singles “Soul Run” and “Endless Chain” were made available on limited edition 7” vinyl.

Release and reception

Soul Run was widely praised in Canadian media. In his Exclaim! review, Ryan B. Patrick called it “…fresh, funky and freeing, a solid soul standout that sets the groundwork for future releases to follow.” Christine Clarke at Now Magazine said listeners will be “…instantly drawn in by her charisma.” CBC Music featured Tanika Charles and her band The Wonderful's in a First Play Live episode, where songs from the Soul Run album were premiered in front of an intimate studio audience.

International reviewers would later agree, such as Music Republic Magazine lauding Soul Run as ”one of the very best soul releases this year thus far, and for a long time, in fact.” Albumism noted it was "...bursting with promise and relatable, down to earth lyrics of love, life and liberation." While interviewing Ad-Rock and Mike D on his NPR podcast, legendary New York radio DJ Bobbito Garcia told his guests that he “…heard Tanika Charles and it just reminded me of that Beastie Boys deep funk, raw soul era.”

Songs from Soul Run have been featured in numerous television and film placements including Kim’s Convenience, Workin’ Moms, Love Jacked as well as a KFC commercial.

Track listing

Notes
  signifies an additional production.
  not included on Canadian release.
 Mixed by Michael Warren, except "Love Fool" mixed by Slakah the Beatchild.
 Mastered by Bryan Lowe at João Carvalho Mastering, except “Sweet Memories” mastered by Gianluca Pighi at Pitgilus Studio.

Personnel
Credits complied from the liner notes of Soul Run and Tanika Charles' website.

 2nd Son - producer
 Adam Risbridger - additional vocals
 Alex St. Kitts - bass
 Anthony Corsi - producer
 Ben Foran - guitar
 Bryan Lowe - mastering
 Christopher Sandes - producer, keys, engineer
 Daniel Lee - songwriter, producer, engineer
 Divine Brown - songwriter, additional vocals
 Fabio Conti - additional layout
 Gianluca Pighi - mastering
 I James Jones - songwriter, additional vocals
 Jacob Hanania - additional vocals
 Jamie Drake - percussion, vibraphone
 Jay Hay - saxophone
 Jennifer Balance - makeup
 Jeremy Strachan - horn arrangements, saxophone
 Jesse Bear - producer
 Jesse Ohtake - management
 Kevin Howley - drums, percussion, engineer
 L’oqenz - additional vocals
 Marlon James - horns
 Matt “Emdee” Reid - producer
 Michael Warren - producer, engineer, management
 Octavio Santos - horns
 Robert Bolton - songwriter
 Ryan Paterson - photography, design
 Sean Nimmons - producer
 Shaun Brodie - trumpet
 Simon Hamilton - producer
 Slakah the Beatchild - songwriter, producer, engineer, additional vocals
 Tanika Charles - vocals, songwriter, producer
 Tao M. Lau - management
 Zaki Ibrahim - songwriter, additional vocals

References 

2017 albums
Tanika Charles albums